The Women's 200 metre breaststroke competition of the 2020 European Aquatics Championships was held on 20 and 21 May 2021.

Records
Before the competition, the existing world, European and championship records were as follows.

Results
The heats were started on 20 May at 10:25.

Heats

Semifinals
The semifinals were started on 20 May at 18:30.

Semifinal 1

Semifinal 2

Final
The final was held on 21 May at 19:19.

References

Women's 200 metre breaststroke

External links